Alexandria Again and Forever (translit.Iskandria Kaman wa Kaman) is the final entry in a trilogy of films by director Youssef Chahine. This 104-minute-long film is mainly in Arabic, with English-language subtitles. It was preceded by the films Alexandria... Why? (1978) and An Egyptian Story (1982). The film features (Salah Zulfikar), (Soad Hosny) and (Adel Emam) among others in cameo appearances representing the Egyptian actors syndicate. The film was selected as the Egyptian entry for the Best Foreign Language Film at the 63rd Academy Awards, but was not accepted as a nominee.

Following a violent outburst with Amr, his favorite actor, the director Yehia Eskandarany (Youssef Chahine) is forced to scrutinize his entire career under scrutiny. Nothing looks familiar any longer. His country and African cinema he loves so much, also looks strange. Little by little, while remembering his first film with Amr, Yehia traces the infiltration of the influential petro-dollar into the Egyptian cinema industry. But was it really money that caused the rift between him and Amr? Or was it the strikingly beautiful Nadia?

See also
Salah Zulfikar filmography
Soad Hosny filmography
Youssef Chahine filmography
List of Egyptian films of the 1990s
 List of submissions to the 63rd Academy Awards for Best Foreign Language Film
 List of Egyptian submissions for the Academy Award for Best Foreign Language Film

References

External links
 Alexandrie encore et toujours  Alexandria again and forever
 Trailer for Alexandrie Encore et Toujours

Egyptian drama films
1980s Arabic-language films
1989 films
1989 drama films
Films directed by Youssef Chahine